Czekołdy  is a village in the administrative district of Gmina Mońki, within Mońki County, Podlaskie Voivodeship, in northeastern Poland.

References

Villages in Mońki County